is a town in central Ivory Coast. It is a sub-prefecture of and the seat of Tiébissou Department in Bélier Region, Lacs District. Tiébissou is also a commune.

In 2021, the population of the sub-prefecture of Tiébissou was 65,251.

Villages
The 37 villages of the sub-prefecture of Tiébissou and their population in 2014 are:

References

Sub-prefectures of Bélier
Communes of Bélier